Katie Barberi is a Mexican actress known for her work in telenovelas and for her portrayal of Ursula Van Pelt on Every Witch Way.

Career
Barberi played "Maria Delucci" in the NBC series The Bronx Zoo.

Filmography

Film

Television roles

References

External links

 
 

Living people
Mexican telenovela actresses
Mexican television actresses
Mexican film actresses
Mexican people of Italian descent
Mexican people of American descent
Mexican people of English descent
Mexican emigrants to the United States
Actresses from Coahuila
20th-century Mexican actresses
21st-century Mexican actresses
People from Saltillo
Mexican expatriate actors in the United States
Year of birth missing (living people)